The Carthage Tariff is a Punic language inscription from the third century BCE, found on a fragments of a limestone stela in 1856-58 at Carthage in Tunisia. It is thought to be related to the Marseille Tariff, found two decades earlier.

It was first published by Nathan Davis, and the 11-line inscription is known as KAI 74 and CIS I 167.

The plaque lists the payments for ritual sacrifices, including which portions go to the priests and which to the offerer. It is thought to have been placed on a temple wall, setting out the rules for those giving offerings.

It is held in the archives of the British Museum, as BM 125303.

Gallery

References

Archaeological artifacts
KAI inscriptions
Punic inscriptions
Phoenician religion
Economy of Phoenicia